Volleyball events were contested at the 1987 Summer Universiade in Zagreb, Yugoslavia.

References
 Universiade volleyball medalists on HickokSports

U
1987 Summer Universiade
Volleyball at the Summer Universiade
Volleyball in Yugoslavia